In enzymology, a L-threonine 3-dehydrogenase is an enzyme that catalyzes the chemical reaction

L-threonine + NAD+  L-2-amino-3-oxobutanoate + NADH + H+

Thus, the two substrates of this enzyme are L-threonine and NAD+, whereas its 3 products are L-2-amino-3-oxobutanoate, NADH, and H+.

This enzyme belongs to the family of oxidoreductases, specifically those acting on the CH-OH group of donor with NAD+ or NADP+ as acceptor. The systematic name of this enzyme class is L-threonine:NAD+ oxidoreductase. Other names in common use include L-threonine dehydrogenase, threonine 3-dehydrogenase, and threonine dehydrogenase. This enzyme participates in glycine, serine and threonine metabolism.

Structural studies

References

 
 
 
 

EC 1.1.1
NADH-dependent enzymes
Enzymes of known structure